Isambard Brunel may refer to individuals from three generations of the engineering dynasty:

 Sir Marc Isambard Brunel (1769–1849), French-born engineer who settled in England
 Isambard Kingdom Brunel (1806–1859), English mechanical and civil engineer
 Isambard Brunel Junior (1837–1902), son of Isambard Kingdom Brunel

See also 
 Isambard